The 1995 Milwaukee Mustangs season was the second season for the Milwaukee Mustangs. They finished the 1995 Arena Football League season 4–8 and were one of two teams in the American Conference to miss the playoffs.

Schedule

Regular season

Standings

Awards

References

Milwaukee Mustangs (1994–2001) seasons
1995 Arena Football League season
Milwaukee Mustangs Season, 1995
1990s in Milwaukee